Jan van Leyden (active 1661 – 1693), was a Dutch Golden Age painter.

Biography
Little is known of his life, but he lived and worked in Rotterdam and is known for marines, often of specific sea battles.

References

Jan van Leyden on Artnet

1640s births
1690s deaths
Dutch Golden Age painters
Dutch male painters
Painters from Rotterdam